Elizabeth Virginia Schofield (1935-2005) was a British-American archaeologist and classical scholar.

Career
Schofield attended Cheltenham Ladies' College in the UK before studying at Wilson College (Pennsylvania). She followed her college studies with a master's degree from Washington State University and then, in 1959, a PhD at the University of Cincinnati under Jack Caskey.

Schofield taught at Cornell University before moving with her partner and family to a teaching position at St John's College, Cambridge. Academically, she focused full-time on excavations at Kea; first with Jack Caskey and then directing the archaeological project there after Caskey's death.

In 2005 she was awarded the distinguished service award by the College of Arts and Sciences at the University of Cincinnati.

Select publications
Schofield, E. 1990. "Conical Cups in Context" in Betancourt, P., Karageorghis, V., Laffineur, R. and Niemeier, W-D. (eds), MELETEMATA. Studies in Aegean Archaeology Presented to Malcolm H. Wiener as He enters his 65th year (Aegeum 20). pp757-760.
Schofield, E. 1990. "Evidence for Household Industries on Thera and Kea" in: Hardy, D.A., Doumas, C.G., Sakellarakis, J.A., Warren, P.M. (eds.), Thera and the Aegean World III, Vol I: Archaeology, Proceedings of the Third International Congress Santorini, Greece 3–9 September 1989. London, The Thera Foundation. pp201-211.
Schofield, E. 2011. Keos: Results of Excavations Conducted by the University of Cincinnati Under the Auspices of the American School of Classical Studies at Athens: Volume X Ayia Irini: The Western Sector.

References

British women archaeologists
British archaeologists
20th-century American archaeologists
1935 births
2005 deaths
Women classical scholars
University of Cincinnati alumni
Cornell University faculty